Sagitario (English Sagittarius) is the second studio album by Mexican pop singer Ana Gabriel. It was released in 1986. Once again, she participated in the OTI Festival with the song A tu Lado (By your side) which she achieved the 5th place.

Track listing
Tracks:
 Mar y Arena
 Y Aquí Estoy
 Eso no Basta
 Tu y Yo
 Que poco Hombre
 Malvado
 Hasta Cuando
 A tu Lado
 Llévame
 Besos Prohibidos

References

1986 albums
Ana Gabriel albums